The Texas Observer (also known as the Observer) is an American magazine with a liberal political outlook. The Observer is published bimonthly by a 501(c)(3) nonprofit organization, the Texas Democracy Foundation. It is headquartered in Austin, Texas.

History
The Observer was founded by Frankie Randolph and Dugger in Austin in 1954 to address topics often ignored by daily newspapers in the state, such as those affecting working people and concerning class and racism.

In the 1970s, Molly Ivins served as the Observer's co-editor and a political reporter.

Notable staff and contributors
Notable Observer staff and contributors, past and present:
Jake Bernstein
Billy Lee Brammer
Minnie Fisher Cunningham
J. Frank Dobie
Ronnie Dugger
John Henry Faulk
James K. Galbraith
Dagoberto Gilb
Lawrence Goodwyn
Jim Hightower
Molly Ivins
Larry L. King
Maury Maverick Jr.
Larry McMurtry
Willie Morris
Americo Paredes
Eileen Welsome
Alan Pogue

References

External links

Official website

501(c)(3) organizations
1954 establishments in Texas
Bimonthly magazines published in the United States
Magazines established in 1954
Magazines published in Austin, Texas
News magazines published in the United States
Politics of Texas
Political magazines published in the United States